The Aetnaville  Bridge is a through truss bridge spanning the back channel of the Ohio River between Bridgeport, Ohio and Wheeling, West Virginia. The bridge was built in December 1891 and used for vehicular traffic until December 1988, when it was closed to cars due to safety concerns. The structure was used by pedestrians until its complete closure in 2016.

During the late 1800's and early 1900's, the bridge was used for streetcars until service ceased in 1937. The bridge is now used mostly as a way for pedestrians, bicyclists, and joggers, to cross without having to go all the way around to the new Bridgeport Bridge. The bridge was closed from October 19 to 23, 2015, to be evaluated for safety. Local residents are fighting to save this bridge, because it is a popular pedestrian footwalk, and part of a proposed bicycle and jogging trail.   As of January 20, 2016, there have been metal fences barricading the bridge pending further decision-making as to how to proceed with possible repairs .

See also 
List of crossings of the Ohio River

References

External links

Aetnaville Bridge at Bridges & Tunnels

Bridges over the Ohio River
Bridges completed in 1891
Pedestrian bridges in Ohio
Pedestrian bridges in West Virginia
Former road bridges in the United States
Historic district contributing properties in Ohio
1891 establishments in Ohio
Historic district contributing properties in West Virginia
Road bridges on the National Register of Historic Places in Ohio
Road bridges on the National Register of Historic Places in West Virginia
National Register of Historic Places in Belmont County, Ohio
National Register of Historic Places in Wheeling, West Virginia
1891 establishments in West Virginia
Steel bridges in the United States
Parker truss bridges in the United States
Buildings and structures in Wheeling, West Virginia
Bridges in Belmont County, Ohio
Transportation in Ohio County, West Virginia